The Billboard Music Awards are honors given out annually by Billboard, a publication covering the music business and a music popularity chart. The Billboard Music Awards show has been held annually since 1990, with the exception of the years 2007 through 2010. The event was formerly staged in December but since returning in 2011, it has been held in May.

Awards process
Unlike other awards, such as the Grammy Award, which determine nominations as a result of the highest votes received by the National Academy of Recording Arts and Sciences, the Billboard Music Awards finalists are based on album and digital songs sales, streaming, radio airplay, touring, and social engagement. These measurements are tracked year-round by Billboard and its data partners, including MRC Data and Next Big Sound. The 2018 awards were based on the reporting period of April 8, 2017 through March 31, 2018. Awards are given for the top album, artist and single in a number of different music genres.

Awards

Categories
From 1990 to 2006, the show had the same categories and category names every year. In 2011, for the first time, all of the awards were renamed to "Top [award title]". The "of the year" portion of each category title no longer exists, and many of the awards have been further renamed. Other awards, including both "crossover" awards (No. 1 Classical Crossover Artist and No. 1 Classical Crossover Album) were discontinued. As of 2017, there are two fan-voted categories.

Current categories
The general categories are Top Artist, Top Billboard 200 Album, Top Hot 100 Song and Top New Artist. These categories highlighted in each award and other categories are divided by genre.

Top Artist
Top New Artist
Top Male Artist
Top Female Artist
Top Duo/Group
Top Billboard 200 Artist
Top Billboard 200 Album
Top Hot 100 Artist
Top Hot 100 Song
Top Touring Artist
Top Song Sales Artist (since 2016)
Top Selling Album (since 2018)
Top Selling Song (since 2016)
Top Radio Songs Artist
Top Radio Song
Top Streaming Artist
Top Streaming Song (Audio)
Top Streaming Song (Video)
Top R&B Artist
Top R&B Male Artist (since 2018)
Top R&B Female Artist (since 2018)
Top R&B Album
Top R&B Song
Top R&B Tour (since 2017)
Top Rap Artist
Top Rap Male Artist (since 2018)
Top Rap Female Artist (since 2018)
Top Rap Album
Top Rap Song
Top Rap Tour (since 2017)
Top Country Artist
Top Country Male Artist (since 2018)
Top Country Female Artist (since 2018)
Top Country Duo/Group Artist (since 2018)
Top Country Album
Top Country Song
Top Country Tour (since 2017)
Top Rock Artist
Top Rock Album
Top Rock Song
Top Rock Tour (since 2017)
Top Latin Artist
Top Latin Male Artist (since 2021)
Top Latin Female Artist (since 2021)
Top Latin Duo/Group (since 2021)
Top Latin Album
Top Latin Song
Top Dance/Electronic Artist (since 2014)
Top Dance/Electronic Album (since 2014)
Top Dance/Electronic Song (since 2014)
Top Christian Artist
Top Christian Album
Top Christian Song
Top Gospel Artist (since 2016)
Top Gospel Album (since 2016)
Top Gospel Song (since 2016)
Top Soundtrack (1993, 1998, 2000, 2006, 2015 – present)
Top Social Artist (fan-voted)
Billboard Chart Achievement (since 2015, fan-voted)
Top Collaboration (since 2017, fan-voted)

Retired categories (1990–2017)

Top Alternative Album
Top Alternative Artist
Top Alternative Song
Top Classical Crossover Artist
Top Classical Crossover Album
Top Country Collaboration (2017)
Top Dance Artist (until 2013)
Top Dance Album (until 2013)
Top Dance Song (until 2013)
Top Digital Media Artist (until 2012)
Top Digital Songs Artist (until 2015)
Top Digital Song (until 2015)
Top EDM Artist (until 2013)
Top EDM Album (until 2013)
Top EDM Song (until 2013)
Top Independent Artists
Top Independent Album
Top Modern Rock Artist
Top Modern Rock Track
Top New Male Artist
Top New Female Artist
Top New Group/Band
Top New Song
Top Pop Song (until 2013)
Top Pop Album (until 2013)
Top Pop Artist (until 2013)
Top Pop Punk Artist
Top Rap Artist (until 2017)
Top R&B Collaboration (2017)
Top Rap Collaboration (2017)
Top Rhythmic Top 40 Title
Top Selling Single
Top Soundtrack Single of the Year
Milestone Award (2013, 2014)

Special awards

Artist Achievement Award
 1993: Rod Stewart
 1994: Whitney Houston
 1995: Janet Jackson
 1996: Madonna
 1997: Garth Brooks
 1999: Aerosmith
 2001: Janet Jackson
 2002: Cher
 2004: Destiny's Child
 2005: Kanye West

Artist of the Decade Award
 1990's: Mariah Carey
 2000's: Eminem
 2010's: Drake

Millennium Award
 2011: Beyoncé
 2012: Whitney Houston (award accepted by her daughter, Bobbi Kristina Brown)
 2016: Britney Spears

Century Award
 1992: George Harrison
 1993: Buddy Guy
 1994: Billy Joel
 1995: Joni Mitchell
 1996: Carlos Santana
 1997: Chet Atkins
 1998: James Taylor
 1999: Emmylou Harris
 2000: Randy Newman
 2001: John Mellencamp
 2002: Annie Lennox
 2003: Sting
 2004: Stevie Wonder
 2005: Tom Petty
 2006: Tony Bennett

Icon Award

2011: Neil Diamond
2012: Stevie Wonder
2013: Prince
2014: Jennifer Lopez
2016: Celine Dion
2017: Cher
2018: Janet Jackson
2019: Mariah Carey
2020: Garth Brooks
2021: P!nk
2022: Mary J. Blige

Spotlight Award
 In 1988, Michael Jackson was honored with Billboard's first Spotlight Award for being the first artist in music history to have five consecutive number ones singles on Billboard Hot 100 from one album. This happened before the Awards were televised. 
 In 2012, Katy Perry was honored with Billboard's second Spotlight award for being the second and first female artist in music history to have five consecutive number ones singles on Billboard Hot 100 from one album.

Change Maker Award
 2020: Killer Mike
 2021: Trae Tha Truth
 2022: Mari Copeny

Other special awards
1992: Special Award commemorating the 10th Anniversary of Thriller: Michael Jackson
1992: No. 1 World Album for Dangerous and No. 1 World Single for "Black or White": Michael Jackson
1993: Special Award for the first single with most weeks at No.1 on the Billboard Hot 100 (14 weeks for "I Will Always Love You"): Whitney Houston
1996: Special Award for most weeks at No. 1 on the Billboard Hot 100 (16 weeks for "One Sweet Day"): Mariah Carey and Boyz II Men
1997: Special Award honoring "Candle In the Wind 1997" as the all-time best selling single: Elton John and Bernie Taupin
1998: Special Award for the most No. 1s ever by a female artist (13): Mariah Carey
2000: Special Award for biggest one-week sales ever of an album: No Strings Attached, NSYNC
2000: Special Award for biggest one-week sales of an album ever by a female artist, Oops!... I Did It Again, Britney Spears
2001: Special Award for biggest one-week sales for an album in 2001: Celebrity, NSYNC
2002: Special Award for 1982 album Thriller, which spent more weeks at No. 1 (37) than any other album in the history of the Billboard 200: Michael Jackson
2003: Special Award for Most weeks at No. 1: Beyoncé (17 weeks with "Crazy in Love" featuring Jay-Z and "Baby Boy" featuring Sean Paul)

Most wins

The record for most Billboard Music Awards won by a female artist is held by Taylor Swift who has won 29 awards. The record for most Billboard Music Awards won by a group is held by BTS who have won 12 awards.

Most Wins in a single ceremony

Performances

Broadcast
Since its inception (created by Rick Garson, Paul Flattery & Jim Yukich), the BMAs had been telecast on the Fox network; however due to contractual expirations and other unforeseen circumstances, the awards were cancelled for 2007. Plans for a new version of the awards in 2008 (in association with AEG Live) fell through, and the BMAs were not held until 2011.

On February 17, 2011, Billboard announced that it would bring the BMAs back to television, moving from its original home on Fox to its new network, ABC, on May 22, 2011. A new award statuette was created by New York firm Society Awards. Dick Clark Productions, which is co-owned with Billboard, began producing the ceremony in 2014. On November 28, 2017, it was announced that the Billboard Music Awards would be moving from ABC to NBC beginning in 2018 under a multi-year contract.

The 2020 ceremony, originally scheduled for April 29, was postponed indefinitely on March 17 due to coronavirus-related public assembly concerns. On August 14, 2020, it was announced that the 2020 ceremony had been rescheduled to October 14.

Ratings

See also
 Billboard Live Music Awards
 Billboard Japan Music Awards
 Billboard Latin Music Awards
 Billboard Women in Music

References

External links

 
Billboard (magazine)
Fox Broadcasting Company original programming
American annual television specials
American Broadcasting Company original programming
Television series by Dick Clark Productions
Awards established in 1990
Awards disestablished in 2006
Awards established in 2011